is a passenger railway station in located in Nishi-ku, Sakai, Osaka Prefecture, Japan, operated by West Japan Railway Company (JR West).

Lines

Station layout
The station consists of two opposed side platforms connected by an elevated station building. The station is staffed.

Platforms

History
Uenoshiba Station opened on 18 July 1929. With the privatization of the Japan National Railways (JNR) on 1 April 1987, the station came under the aegis of the West Japan Railway Company.

Station numbering was introduced in March 2018 with Uenoshiba being assigned station number JR-R31.

Passenger statistics
In fiscal 2019, the station was used by an average of 8701 passengers daily (boarding passengers only).

Surrounding area
 Mozu Tombs
 Sakai City Uenoshiba Elementary School
 Osaka Prefectural Sakai Support School
 Osaka Prefectural Sakai Hearing Support School

See also
List of railway stations in Japan

References

External links

 Uenoshiba Station information 

Railway stations in Osaka Prefecture
Railway stations in Japan opened in 1929
Sakai, Osaka